Hunan is a landlocked province of the People's Republic of China, part of the South Central China region. Located in the middle reaches of the Yangtze watershed, it borders the province-level divisions of Hubei to the north, Jiangxi to the east, Guangdong and Guangxi to the south, Guizhou to the west and Chongqing to the northwest. Its capital and largest city is Changsha, which also abuts the Xiang River. Hengyang, Zhuzhou, and Yueyang are among its most populous urban cities. It is the largest province in South-Central China and the fourth largest among landlocked provinces and the 10th most extensive province by area.

Hunan's nominal GDP was US$724 billion (CNY 4.6 trillion) as of 2021, appearing in the world's top 20 largest sub-national economies, with its GDP (PPP) being over US$1.1 trillion. Hunan is the 9th-largest provincial economy of China, the fourth largest in South Central China, the third largest in Central China and the fourth largest among landlocked provinces. Its GDP (nominal) per capita exceeded US$10,900 (69,300 CNY), making it the third richest province in the South Central China region after Guangdong and Hubei. As of 2020, Hunan's GDP (nominal) reached 605 billion US dollars (CNY 4.18 trillion), exceeding that of Poland, with a GDP of US$596 billion and Thailand, with a GDP of US$501 billion, the 22nd and 25th largest in the world respectively.

The name Hunan literally means "south of the lake". The lake that is referred to is Dongting Lake, a lake in the northeast of the province; Vehicle license plates from Hunan are marked , after the Xiang River, which runs from south to north through Hunan and forms part of the largest drainage system for the province. The area of Hunan was under Chinese rule as far back as 350 BC. Hunan was the birthplace of communist revolutionary Mao Zedong, who became the Chairman of the Chinese Communist Party and the founding father of the People's Republic of China. Hunan today is home to some ethnic minorities, including the Tujia and Miao, along with the Han Chinese, who make up a majority of the population. Varieties of Chinese spoken include Xiang, Gan and Southwestern Mandarin.

The site of Wulingyuan was inscribed as a UNESCO World Heritage Site in 1992. Changsha, the capital, is located in the eastern part of the province; it is now an important commercial, manufacturing and transportation centre. The busiest airports serve domestic and international flights for Hunan, including Changsha Huanghua International Airport, Zhangjiajie Hehua International Airport and Changde Taohuayuan Airport. Hunan is the seat of the Yuelu Academy (later become Hunan University), which is one of the four major academies over the last 1000 years in ancient China. As of 2022, Hunan hosts 130 institutions of higher education, ranking sixth among all Chinese provinces.

History 

Hunan's primeval forests were first occupied by the ancestors of the modern Miao, Tujia, Dong and Yao peoples. The province entered written Chinese history around 350 BC, when the province became part of the Zhou dynasty. After Qin conquered the Chu in 278 BC, the region came under the control of Qin, and then the Changsha Kingdom during the Han dynasty. At this time, and for hundreds of years thereafter, the province was a magnet for settlement of Han Chinese from the north, who displaced and assimilated the original indigenous inhabitants, cleared forests and began farming rice in the valleys and plains. The agricultural colonization of the lowlands was carried out in part by the Han people, which managed river dikes to protect farmland from floods. To this day, many of the small villages in Hunan are named after the Han families who settled there. Migration from the north was especially prevalent during the Eastern Jin dynasty and the Northern and Southern dynasties periods, when nomadic invaders (Five Barbarians) pushed these peoples south.

During the Five Dynasties and Ten Kingdoms period, Hunan was home to its own independent regime, Ma Chu.

Hunan and Hubei became a part of the province of Huguang until the Qing dynasty. Hunan province was created in 1664 from Huguang, renamed to its current name in 1723.

Hunan became an important communications center due to its position on the Yangzi River. It was an important centre of scholarly activity and Confucian thought, particularly in the Yuelu Academy in Changsha. It was also on the Imperial Highway constructed between northern and southern China. The land produced grain so abundantly that it fed many parts of China with its surpluses. The population continued to climb until, by the nineteenth century, Hunan became overcrowded and prone to peasant uprisings. Some of the uprisings, such as the ten-year Miao Rebellion of 1795–1806, were caused by ethnic tensions. The Taiping Rebellion began in the south in Guangxi Province in 1850. The rebellion spread into Hunan and then further eastward along the Yangzi River valley. Ultimately, it was a Hunanese army (Xiang Army) under Zeng Guofan who marched into Nanjing to put down the uprising in 1864. 

In 1920, a famine raged throughout Hunan and killed an estimated 2 million Hunanese civilians. This sparked the Autumn Harvest Uprising of 1927. It was led by Hunanese native Mao Zedong, and established a short-lived Hunan Soviet in 1927. The Communists maintained a guerrilla army in the mountains along the Hunan-Jiangxi border until 1934. Under pressure from the Nationalist Kuomintang (KMT) forces, they began the Long March to bases in Shaanxi Province. After the departure of the Communists, the KMT army fought against the Japanese in the second Sino-Japanese war. They defended Changsha until it fell in 1944. Japan launched Operation Ichigo, a plan to control the railroad from Wuchang to Guangzhou (Yuehan Railway). Hunan was relatively unscathed by the civil war that followed the defeat of the Japanese in 1945. In 1949, the Communists returned once more as the Nationalists retreated southward.

In the 1950s General Wang Zhen coerced thousands of Hunanese women into sexual servitude at PLA units in Xinjiang.

As Mao Zedong's home province, Hunan supported the Cultural Revolution of 1966–1976. However, it was slower than most provinces in adopting the reforms implemented by Deng Xiaoping in the years that followed Mao's death in 1976.

In addition to CCP Chairman Mao Zedong, a number of other first-generation communist leaders were also from Hunan: Chinese President Liu Shaoqi; CCP Secretary-generals Ren Bishi and Hu Yaobang; Marshals Peng Dehuai, He Long, and Luo Ronghuan; Wang Zhen, one of the Eight Elders; Xiang Jingyu, the first female member of the CCP's central committee; Senior General Huang Kecheng; and veteran diplomat Lin Boqu. An example of a more recent leader from Hunan is former Chinese Premier Zhu Rongji.

Geography 

Hunan is located on the south bank of the Yangtze River, about half way along its length, situated between 108° 47'–114° 16' east longitude and 24° 37'–30° 08' north latitude. The east, south and west sides of the province are surrounded by mountains and hills, such as the Wuling Mountains to the northwest, the Xuefeng Mountains to the west, the Nanling Mountains to the south, and the Luoxiao Mountains to the east. Mountains and hills occupy more than 80% of the province, and plains less than 20%. At 2115.2 meters above sea level, the highest point in Hunan province is Lingfeng.

The Xiang, the Zi, the Yuan and the Lishui Rivers converge on the Yangtze River at Lake Dongting in the north of Hunan. The center and northern parts are somewhat low and a U-shaped basin, open in the north and with Lake Dongting as its center. Most of Hunan lies in the basins of four major tributaries of the Yangtze River.

Lake Dongting is the largest lake in the province and the second largest freshwater lake of China.

The Xiaoxiang area and Lake Dongting figure prominently in Chinese poetry and paintings, particularly during the Song dynasty when they were associated with officials who had been unjustly dismissed.

Changsha (which means "long sands") was an active ceramics district during the Tang dynasty, its tea bowls, ewers and other products mass-produced and shipped to China's coastal cities for export abroad. An Arab dhow dated to the 830s and today known as the Belitung Shipwreck was discovered off the small island of Belitung, Indonesia with more than 60,000 pieces in its cargo. The salvaged cargo is today housed in nearby Singapore.

Hunan's climate is subtropical, and, under the Köppen climate classification, is classified as being humid subtropical (Köppen Cfa), with short, cool, damp winters, very hot and humid summers, and plenty of rainfall.
The Furongian Epoch in the Cambrian Period of geological time is named for Hunan; Furong means "lotus" in Mandarin and refers to Hunan which is known as the "lotus state".

Administrative divisions

Hunan is divided into fourteen prefecture-level divisions: thirteen prefecture-level cities and an autonomous prefecture:

The fourteen prefecture-level divisions of Hunan are subdivided into 122 county-level divisions (35 districts, 17 county-level cities, 63 counties, 7 autonomous counties). Those are in turn divided into 2587 township-level divisions (1098 towns, 1158 townships, 98 ethnic townships, 225 subdistricts, and eight district public offices). At the year end of 2017, the total population is 68.6 million.

Urban areas

Politics

The politics of Hunan is structured in a dual party-government system like all other governing institutions in mainland China.

The Governor of Hunan is the highest-ranking official in the People's Government of Hunan. However, in the province's dual party-government governing system, the Governor has less power than the Hunan Chinese Communist Party Provincial Committee Secretary, colloquially termed the "Hunan CCP Party Chief".

Economy 
As of the mid 19th century, Hunan exported rhubarb, musk, honey, tobacco, hemp, and birds. The Lake Dongting area is an important center of ramie production, and Hunan is also an important center of tea cultivation. Aside from agricultural products, in recent years Hunan has grown to become an important center for steel, machinery and electronics production, especially as China's manufacturing sector moves away from coastal provinces such as Guangdong and Zhejiang.

The Lengshuijiang area is noted for its stibnite mines, and is one of the major centers of antimony extraction in China. 

Hunan is also well known for a few global makers of construction equipment such as concrete pumps, cranes, etc. These companies include Sany Group, Zoomlion and Sunward. Sany is one of the world's major players. The city of Liuyang is the world's top center for manufacturing fireworks.

Hunan is the 9th-largest provincial economy of China, the third largest in the Central China region after Henan and Hubei, the fourth largest in the South Central China region after Guangdong, Henan and Hubei and the fourth largest among inland provinces after Henan, Sichuan and Hubei. As of 2021, Hunan's nominal GDP was US$724 billion (CNY 4.6 trillion), appearing in the world's top 20 largest sub-national economies with its GDP (Purchasing Power Parity) being over US$1.1 trillion, and its GDP (nominal) per capita exceeded US$10,900 (69,300 CNY), making it the 2nd richest in the Central China region after Hubei and the 3rd richest in South Central China region after Guangdong and Hubei.

As of 2020, Hunan's GDP (nominal) was US$605 billion, making it larger than the economies of Poland (the 22nd biggest in the world), Thailand (the 2nd largest in ASEAN), and Nigeria (the largest in Africa).

Economic and technological development zones
 Changsha National Economic and Technical Development Zone
The Changsha National Economic and Technology Development Zone was founded in 1992. It is located east of Changsha. Near the zone is National Highways G319 and G107 as well as Jingzhu Highway. Besides that, it is very close to the downtown and the railway station. The major industries in the zone include high-tech industry, biology project technology and new material industry.
 Changsha National New & Hi-Tech Industrial Development Zone
 Chenzhou Export Processing Zone
Approved by the State Council, Chenzhou Export processing Zone (CEPZ) was established in 2005 and is the only export processing zone in Hunan province. The scheduled production area of CEPZ covers 3km2. The industrial positioning of CEPZ is to concentrate on developing export-oriented hi-tech industries, including electronic information, precision machinery, and new-type materials. The zone has good infrastructure, and the enterprises inside could enjoy the preferential policies of tax-exemption, tax-guarantee and tax-refunding. By the end of the "Eleventh Five-Year Plan", the CEPZ achieved a total export and import volume of over US$1 billion and provided more than 50,000 jobs. It aimed to be one of the first-class export processing zones in China.
 Zhuzhou National New & Hi-Tech Industrial Development Zone
Zhuzhou Hi-Tech Industrial Development Zone was founded in 1992. It is very close to National Highway G320. The major industries in the zone include biotechnology, food processing and heavy industry. In 2007, the park signed a cooperation contract with Beijing Automobile Industry, one of the largest auto makers in China, which will set up a manufacturing base in Zhuzhou HTP.

Demographics

As of the 2000 census, the population of Hunan is 64,400,700 consisting of forty-one ethnic groups. Its population grew 6.17% (3,742,700) from its 1990 levels. According to the census, 89.79% (57,540,000) identified themselves as Han Chinese and 10.21% (6,575,300) as minority groups. The minority groups are Tujia, Miao, Dong, Yao, Bai, Hui, Zhuang, Uyghurs and so on.

In Hunan, ethnic minority languages are spoken in the following prefectures.

Xiangxi Tujia and Miao Autonomous Prefecture: Qo Xiong language, Tujia language
Huaihua: Qo Xiong language, Dong language, Hm Nai language, Hmu language
Shaoyang: Maojia language, Hm Nai language, Pa-Hng language
Yongzhou: Mien language, Biao Min language
Chenzhou: Dzao Min language

Hunanese Uyghurs
Around 5,000 Uyghurs live around Taoyuan County and other parts of Changde. Hui and Uyghurs have intermarried in this area. In addition to eating pork, the Uygurs of Changde practice other Han Chinese customs, like ancestor worship at graves. Some Uyghurs from Xinjiang visit the Hunan Uyghurs out of curiosity or interest. The Uyghurs of Hunan do not speak the Uyghur language, instead, Chinese is spoken as their native language.

Religion

The predominant religions in Hunan are Chinese Buddhism, Taoist traditions and Chinese folk religions. According to surveys conducted in 2007 and 2009, 20.19% of the population believes and is involved in ancestor veneration, while 0.77% of the population identifies as Christian. The reports didn't give figures for other types of religion; 79.04% of the population may be either irreligious or involved in worship of nature deities, Buddhism, Confucianism, Taoism, folk religious sects.

In 2010, there are 118.799 Muslims in Hunan

Notable people 

 Zeng Guofan (1811–1872)
 Cai E (1882–1916), Chinese revolutionary leader, General and Governor of Yunnan (1911-1913)
 Jiang Xiaowan (?–1922), interpreter
 Mao Zedong (1893–1976)
 Ma Ying-jeou (born 1950)
 Yuet-ching Lee (1918–1997), Hong Kong actress
 Ted Hui (born 1982), Hong Kong politician

Culture 
Hunan's culture industry generated 87 billion yuan (US$11.76 billion) in economic value in 2007, and is major contributor to the province's economic growth. The industry accounts for 7.5 percent of the region's GDP.

Language 
Xiang Chinese is the eponymous variety of Chinese spoken in Hunan. There are several varieties of Xiang Chinese, such as New Xiang, Old Xiang, and Hengzhou Xiang. In addition to Xiang Chinese, there are also other dialects and languages present, such as Southwestern Mandarin, Hakka, Waxiang, and Xiangnan Tuhua. Nü shu, a writing system for Xiangnan Tuhua, is used exclusively among women in Jiangyong County and neighboring areas in southern Hunan.

Cuisine 
Hunanese cuisine is noted for its near-ubiquitous use of chili peppers, garlic, and shallots. These ingredients give rise to a distinctive dry-and-spicy taste, with dishes such as smoked cured ham, and stir-fried spicy beef being prime examples of the flavor.

Music 
Huaguxi is a local form of Chinese opera that is very popular in Hunan province.

Tourism 
Located in the south central part of the Chinese mainland, Hunan has long been known for its natural environment. It is surrounded by mountains on the east, west, and south, and by the Yangtze River on the north. For thousands of years, the region has been a major center of agriculture, growing rice, tea, and oranges. China's first all glass suspension bridge was also opened in Hunan, in Shiniuzhai National Geological Park.

Wulingyuan is a World Heritage Site and a 5A Scenic Area. Located in south-central Hunan, Wulingyuan is noted for its thousands of quartzite sandstone pillars, caves, and waterfalls. The area also contains Zhangjiajie National Forest Park.
 Shaoshan County, known for being the birthplace of Mao Zedong
 Yueyang Tower, on the shores of Lake Dongting, was built in the Han and Jin dynasties, and has existed in its current state since the Qing Dynasty. Alongside the Pavilion of Prince Teng and Yellow Crane Tower, it is one of the Three Great Towers of Jiangnan.
 Mount Heng, in Hengyang, is one of the Five Great Mountains of China, and is home to the largest temple in southern China.
 Fenghuang County, in Xiangxi Prefecture, has been placed on the UNESCO World Heritage Tentative List for its ancient town. Fenghuang is known for its incorporation of mountain features and water flow into city design, and the ancient syncretism between the local Han and Miao cultures.

Education and research
As of 2022, Hunan hosts 130 institutions of higher education, ranking sixth together with Hubei (130) among all Chinese provinces after Jiangsu (168), Guangdong (160), Henan (156), Shandong (153), and Sichuan (134). Hunan is also the seat of 12 adult higher education institutions. Two major cities in Hunan (Changsha and Xiangtan) were ranked in the top 500 cities in the world by scientific research output, as tracked by the Nature Index in 2017. There are three national key universities under Project 985 (Hunan University, Central South University and the National University of Defense Technology) in Hunan, the third highest after Beijing and Shanghai. Hunan Normal University in Changsha is the key construction university of the national 211 Project, and Xiangtan University in Xiangtan is a key university jointly built by Hunan Province and the Ministry of Education and a member of national Project 111. These five national key universities are included in the Double First-Class Universities of Hunan Province.

Hunan University and Central South University are the only two universities in Changsha, Hunan to appear in the world's top 300 of the Academic Ranking of World Universities and the U.S. News & World Report Best Global University Ranking. Hunan Normal University, the National University of Defense and Technology and Changsha University of Science and Technology located in Changsha, were ranked in the world's top 701 of the Academic Ranking of World Universities. Hunan Agricultural University in Changsha and Hunan University of Technology in Zhuzhou were ranked in the top 901 globally of the 2022 Academic Ranking of World Universities. Hunan University of Science and Technology in Xiangtan, Xiangtan University and Central South University of Forestry and Technology in Changsha were ranked number 988, number 1024 and number 1429 respectively in the 2022 Best Global Universities by the U.S. News & World Report Best Global University Ranking. Hunan University of Chinese Medicine in Changsha ranked the best in Hunan and 33rd nationwide among Chinese Medical Universities.

National key public universities 
 Central South University (Project 211, Project 985, Double First Class University)
 Hunan University (Project 211, Project 985, Double First Class University)
 Hunan Normal University (Project 211, Double First Class University)
 National University of Defense Technology (Project 211, Project 985, Double First Class University)
 Xiangtan University (Project 111, Double First Class University)

Provincial key public universities 
 Central South University of Forestry and Technology
 Changsha University of Science and Technology
 Hengyang Normal University
 Hunan Agricultural University
 Hunan First Normal University
 Hunan Institute of Science and Technology
 Hunan Institute of Engineering
 Hunan University of Technology and Commerce
 Hunan University of Chinese Medicine
 Hunan University of Science and Technology
 Hunan University of Technology
 Hunan University of Humanities, Science and Technology
 Jishou University
 University of South China
 Shaoyang University

General undergraduate universities (public) 
 Changsha Normal University
 Changsha University
 Hunan University of Finance and Economics
 Hunan Police Academy
 Hunan Women's University
 Hunan Institute of Technology
 Hunan University of Science and Engineering
 Xiangtan Institute of Technology

General undergraduate universities (private) 
 Changsha Medical University
 Hunan International Economics University
 Hunan Institute of Information Technology
 Hunan Institute of Traffic Engineering
 Hunan Applied Technology University

Vocational and technical colleges/universities 
 Changsha Aeronautical Vocational and Technical College
 Changsha Social Work College
 Hunan Software Vocational College

Transport

Airports 
There are several airports in Hunan provinces, including Changsha Huanghua International Airport, Zhangjiajie Hehua International Airport, Changde Taohuayuan Airport, Chenzhou Beihu Airport, Huaihua Zhijiang Airport, Shaoyang Wugang Airport, Yongzhou Lingling Airport, and Yueyang Sanhe Airport. The busiest airports serve domestic and international flights for Hunan, including Changsha Huanghua International Airport, Zhangjiajie Hehua International Airport and Changde Taohuayuan Airport. Notably, as of 2021, Changsha Huanghua International Airport was one of the 50 busiest airports in the world, the 12th busiest civil airport in China, the second busiest in South Central China after Guangzhou Baiyun International Airport and the busiest in Central China.

Railways 

The Beijing–Guangzhou high-speed railway passes through Hunan.

Sports 

Professional sports teams in Hunan include:
 Chinese Football Association League One
 Hunan Billows F.C.

See also 
Major national historical and cultural sites in Hunan
Xiaoxiang,  the "lakes and rivers" region of south-central China
State of Chu, ancient Chinese state partly in modern-day Hunan
Hunanese people

Notes

References

External links

Hunan Government website

Economic profile for Hunan at HKTDC
"History of Hunanese", the first book on the history of Hunanese(Phoelanese) civilization and nation from the perspective of we the hunanese (phoelanese) people.

 
.
Provinces of the People's Republic of China